The 1915 South Carolina Gamecocks football team represented the University of South Carolina during the 1915 Southern Intercollegiate Athletic Association football season. It was the team's first season in the Southern Intercollegiate Athletic Association (SIAA). Led by Norman B. Edgerton in his fourth and final season as head coach, the Gamecocks compiled an overall record of 5–3–1 with a mark of 1–1–1 in SIAA play.

Schedule

References

South Carolina
South Carolina Gamecocks football seasons
South Carolina Gamecocks football